Hafina Clwyd (1 July 1936 – 14 March 2011) was a Welsh educator, writer and journalist. She had a weekly column in the Western Mail.

Early life and education
Mair Hafina Clwyd Jones was born at Gwyddelwern, and raised on a farm at Llandyrnog. Her family were Welsh speakers. She trained to be a teacher at Bangor Normal College.

Career
Clwyd moved to London at age 21, to work as a teacher. There she co-founded a Welsh literary club, and was an officer of the Honourable Society of Cymmrodorion.

After returning to Wales in the late 1970s, she edited a community newspaper in Ruthin (Y Bedol) and a national weekly newspaper, Y Faner. She was on the Ruthin town council from 1999 until the year she died, and served a term as mayor of the town (2008–2009). She was recognized with an honorary fellowship at Bangor University in 2005, "for services to journalism."

Clwyd published eleven books, mainly essay collections, including Clichau yn y Glaw (1973), Defaid yn Chwerthin (1980), Clust y Wenci (1997) and Prynu Lein Ddillad (2009) Her works also included an edition of her own diaries from young womanhood, Buwch ar y Lein (1987), an autobiography, Merch Morfydd (1987), and a local history, Pobol sy'n Cyfri (2001). She also edited Welsh Family History: A Guide to Research. Her last book, Mynd i'r Gwrych: Dyddiaduron, 1993–1999 (2011) was published posthumously.

Personal life
Clwyd married fellow teacher Clifford Coppack as her second husband in 1971. She was widowed in 1997. Hafina Clwyd died in 2011, age 74, from melanoma.

References

1936 births
2011 deaths
20th-century essayists
21st-century essayists
20th-century Welsh educators
21st-century Welsh educators
20th-century Welsh writers
21st-century Welsh historians
20th-century Welsh women writers
21st-century Welsh women writers
21st-century Welsh writers
20th-century women educators
21st-century women educators
Welsh columnists
Welsh women columnists
Welsh journalists
Welsh women journalists
People from Denbighshire
Welsh women educators
Welsh newspaper editors
Women newspaper editors
Mayors of places in Wales
Women mayors of places in Wales
Welsh essayists
British women essayists
Welsh diarists
Women diarists
Welsh autobiographers
Women autobiographers
Welsh women historians
Deaths from melanoma
Historians of Wales